Jefferson Township is one of the twenty-two townships of Tuscarawas County, Ohio, United States.  The 2000 census found 976 people in the township, 792 of whom lived in the unincorporated portions of the township.

Geography
Located in the southwestern part of the county, it borders the following townships:
York Township - northeast
Clay Township - southeast
Salem Township - south
Adams Township, Coshocton County - southwest corner
Bucks Township - west
Auburn Township - northwest

The village of Stone Creek is located in central Jefferson Township.

Name and history
It is one of twenty-four Jefferson Townships statewide.

Government
The township is governed by a three-member board of trustees, who are elected in November of odd-numbered years to a four-year term beginning on the following January 1. Two are elected in the year after the presidential election and one is elected in the year before it. There is also an elected township fiscal officer, who serves a four-year term beginning on April 1 of the year after the election, which is held in November of the year before the presidential election. Vacancies in the fiscal officership or on the board of trustees are filled by the remaining trustees.  The current trustees are Perry Beavers, Scott P. Swaldo, and Kenneth Miskimen, and the fiscal officer is Brian Pfeiffer.

References

External links
County website

Townships in Tuscarawas County, Ohio
Townships in Ohio